Walter Defends Sarajevo is a 1972 Yugoslav partisan film, directed by Hajrudin Krvavac and starring Bata Živojinović, Ljubiša Samardžić and Rade Marković. The film centres around a mysterious figure named 'Walter', who is actively disrupting the attempts of German commander Alexander Löhr to retreat from the Balkans. The film's eponymous character, Walter, is loosely based around Vladimir Perić, whose nom de guerre was 'Valter'.

Plot
In late 1944, as the end of World War II approaches, the Wehrmacht's high command determines to pull out General Alexander Löhr's Army Group E from the Balkans back to Germany. They plan to supply the tank columns with fuel from a depot in Sarajevo. The Yugoslav partisans' leader in the city, a mysterious man known as Walter, presents a grave danger to the operation's success, and the Germans dispatch Standartenführer von Dietrich of the SD to deal with him. As no one in the city seems to know what Walter even looks like, Dietrich manages to have an operative infiltrate the resistance under the guise of Walter himself. The partisans are caught in a deadly game of betrayal, fraud and imposture while trying to frustrate the Germans' plans.

Ending
At the end of the movie, von Dietrich muses that he has finally realised why he never managed to defeat his nemesis Walter; standing on a hill he points at Sarajevo below and remarks in German: Sehen Sie diese Stadt?  Das ist Walter! ("You see that city?  That's Walter!")  This was intended to send a message of unity consistent with the official politics of the multi-ethnic state of Yugoslavia.

Cast
Bata Živojinović as Pilot (Walter)
Ljubiša Samardžić as Zis
Rade Marković as Sead Kapetanović
Slobodan Dimitrijević as Suri
Neda Spasojević as Mirna
Dragomir Gidra Bojanić as Kondor
Pavle Vuisić as train dispatcher
Faruk Begolli as Branko
Stevo Žigon as Dr Mišković
Jovan Janićijević as Josic
Relja Bašić as Obersturmführer
Hannjo Hasse as Col. von Dietrich
Rolf Römer as SS-Hauptsturmführer Bischoff
Fred Delmare as Sgt. Edele (credited as Axel Delmare)
Herbert Köfer as German general
Wilhelm Koch-Hooge as Lieutenant Colonel Hagen
Helmut Schreiber as Lieutenant Colonel Weiland
Emir Kusturica as a young man

Production
Although not aiming to reflect history, the film's leading character was named after the partisan leader Vladimir Perić, known by his nom de guerre 'Walter', who commanded a resistance group in Sarajevo from 1943 until his death in the battle to liberate the city on April 6, 1945. Hajrudin Krvavac dedicated the picture to the people of Sarajevo and their heroism during the war.

The film marked the beginning of Emir Kusturica's career in cinema. Sixteen years of age at the time, it was his first appearance on film in a small role playing a young communist activist.

Release
The film premiered in Sarajevo on Wednesday, 12 April 1972 in front of 5,000 spectators at the recently built Skenderija Hall. The venue thus hosted another lavish partisan film première, two and a half years after Veljko Bulajić's Battle of Neretva premiered in October 1969. Marshal Josip Broz Tito wasn't in attendance this time, though the premiere still saw its share of Yugoslav celebrities and functionaries including the film's cast as well as the Red Star Belgrade head coach Miljan Miljanić, actress Špela Rozin, Skenderija's director and former Sarajevo mayor Ljubo Kojo, Bosna Film chairman Neđo Parežanin, etc.

Reception
Walter Defends Sarajevo received a favorable response from the Yugoslav audience, especially in Sarajevo itself.

The film was distributed in sixty countries, and achieved its greatest success in the People's Republic of China, becoming the country's most popular foreign film in the 1970s. Owing mainly to the Chinese audience, Walter Defends Sarajevo is one of the most watched war films of all time.

Legacy

The theme of brotherhood and unity within the Yugoslav population in the face of foreign occupation became a point of reference for the New Primitives' punk sub-culture. Zabranjeno Pušenje, one of the movement's leading bands, named their first album Das ist Walter, in honour of the film.

In China, children and streets were named after characters from the film, and a beer brand called 'Walter' was marketed with Velimir Živojinović's picture on the label. It still enjoys great popularity in the country. The film also continues to remain a mainstay of diplomatic and economic relations between China and the Western Balkans, with Chinese tourists contributing significantly to local tourism industries, and the implementation of visa-free travel between Bosnia and China.

The names of numerous hospitality venues throughout the Balkans (mostly in Bosnia and Serbia) have been inspired by the film.

A museum in Sarajevo dedicated to the film was also opened in April 2019.

References

Bibliography

External links
 

1972 films
Yugoslav war films
Serbo-Croatian-language films
1970s German-language films
Films set in the 1940s
World War II films based on actual events
Partisan films
Films set in Sarajevo
Films set in Bosnia and Herzegovina
Films set in Yugoslavia
Culture in Sarajevo
Films directed by Hajrudin Krvavac
1972 war films
Yugoslav World War II films
1972 multilingual films
Yugoslav multilingual films